Kingston Road is a major arterial road in Toronto and Durham Region, Ontario. It the southernmost major (mainly) east-west road in the eastern portion of Toronto, specifically in the district of Scarborough, and runs east to Ajax in Durham. Until 1998, it formed a portion of Highway 2. The name of the street is derived from Kingston, Ontario as the road was the primary route used to travel from Toronto to the settlements east of it situated along the shores of Lake Ontario; in the west end of Kingston, the road was referred to as the York Road (referring to Toronto) until at least 1908, and is today named Princess Street.

Due to its diagonal course near the shore of Lake Ontario, the street is the terminus of many arterial roads in eastern Toronto, both east–west and north-south, with a few continuing for a short distance after as minor residential streets. However Lawrence Avenue continues as a major arterial for a considerable distance beyond it.

The road no longer bears the name "Kingston Road" anywhere east of Ajax, and thus has effectively been dramatically shortened from its original length. This is in contrast to other long-distance historic "streets" such as Dundas Street, which runs from Toronto to London and still carries that name in the latter city and in many points in between.

History
American engineer Asa Danforth Jr. was contracted to build a road as a route to connect Toronto (then called York) with the mouth of the Trent River in 1799 at a cost of $90.00 per mile. The road, known as The Scarborough Front Road, was completed by December 18, 1800, but was poorly maintained thereafter. In 1815 the Kingston Road was surveyed and it followed the line, in many cases, of the former road laid out by Asa Danforth as far as the Trent River. Beyond that point, the two historic roads diverge. The Kingston Road was completed in 1817, serving as a post road for stagecoaches delivering mail.

Route description
The Toronto section runs from Queen Street East, as a continuation of Eastern Avenue, just west of Woodbine Avenue (route to Lake Shore Boulevard, the westerly continuation of former Highway 2), through Scarborough to Toronto's eastern city limits with Durham Region, where it continues into Pickering and Ajax (as Durham Regional Highway 2), and officially ends where its name changes to Dundas Street in Whitby, at Lake Ridge Road (Durham Regional Road 23), just west of Highway 412.
 
A small portion of road parallel to Kingston Road, called Old Kingston Road, runs near the Highland Creek, east of Morningside Avenue. There is a discontinuity and a large reduction in capacity as the road reverts to the original route at an interchange with Military Trail, where traffic is defaulted onto Highway 2A, which was constructed in 1947 as a precursor to Highway 401, and later became a spur when that highway was extended westwards along a more northerly alignment. To facilitate traffic to and from Highway 401 and to preserve the historic village of West Hill, the spur was retained, and Kingston Road was never widened and reconnected as a through street although it has six lanes on either side of West Hill. Other former parallel sections, also called Old Kingston Road, exist in Ajax and Courtice, although but Road proper does not reach Courtice today. There is also an old section of the old Danforth Road in Grafton.

The southwesternmost section in the Beaches area is a traditional urban street with storefronts, high pedestrian traffic, and streetcars.

Until Highway 401 was constructed, Kingston Road was the principal route from Toronto to points east. Accordingly, it became the site of numerous inns and motels, many of which still dot the road, particularly in Scarborough. Now some of these inns are being demolished to make way for townhouse developments. Kingston Road is a six-lane principal arterial road through most of Scarborough, narrowing to four lanes in Durham, with a  speed limit for the most part.

Public Transit

History

Kingston Road Tramway 
From 1875 to 1887 Kingston Road Tramway ran horsecars from Don Rver (Don Bridge - now Old Eastern Avenue Bridge) to Main Street (moved further east to Blantyre Avenue in 1878 to serve Scarboro' Heights Hotel). The single track route had three major stops (Don Bridge, Woodbine, Ben Lamond Hotel at Main Street and Scarboro Heights Hotel at Blantyre Avenue) running 12 times daily and 13 on Saturday in summer. The route ceased operation in 1887.

Toronto and Scarboro' Electric Railway, Light and Power Company 

The Toronto and Scarboro' Electric Railway, Light and Power Company inaugurated a single-track radial service along Kingston Road from Queen Street as far as Blantyre Avenue, just east of Victoria Park Avenue, in 1893. The line was extended in stages, reaching its furthest extent east of Morningside Avenue in West Hill in 1906. The TTC assumed tracks on the line in 1922 and converted service as far as the newly constructed Bingham Loop (Victoria Park) to double-track city streetcars by the end of the year, and to Birchmount Loop in 1928, with radial service continuing in each case beyond. Radial service was closed east of Eglinton Avenue, replaced by buses, in 1930, and all radial service ceased in favour of buses in 1936. TTC streetcar service was truncated at Bingham Loop in 1954, leaving the service as outlined in the following section.

114 Kingston road bus 
From 1980 to 1990, with the opening of Kennedy station, the 114 Kingston Road East bus route served Kingston Road running from Warden Station to Markham Road with another branch running to Lawrence Avenue and Beechgrove Drive. It was replaced by the 12 Kingston road and 102 Markham road

Present day public transit 
In Toronto, west of Victoria Park, the street is served by the Toronto Transit Commission (TTC), which operates a streetcar service (503 Kingston Rd) route during weekday daytime and streetcars being replaced by buses during evenings, weekends and holidays by the 22A extension of the 22 Coxwell bus. East of Victoria Park Avenue, the main route is the 12 Kingston being the main service until Brimley, with the 12D operating during some periods east to Morningside. The 102 and 86 operate for the majority of where 12D operates all day, and the 86 continues east of Morningside to Meadowvale. In Durham, Kingston Road is served by Durham Region Transit's (DRT) Pulse bus rapid transit and GO Transit, which both operate routes, originating in Toronto, with duplicate routing (although routing and termini are separate within Toronto) along it.

In 2020, bus lanes were install from Eglinton to Morningside as part of the Eglinton East RapidTo bus lanes project.

The routes that primarily serve the street are:

Toronto (TTC):

Durham Region (DRT) and GO Transit:

See also
 Highway 401
 Highway 2
 Highway 2A

References

Bibliography

 

Kingston Road
Transport in Ajax, Ontario
Roads in the Regional Municipality of Durham
Roads in Toronto
Transport in Pickering, Ontario
Transport in Scarborough, Toronto